Nebria suensoni is a species of ground beetle from the Nebriinae subfamily that is endemic to Xinjiang province of  China.

References

sublivida
Beetles described in 1889
Beetles of Asia
Endemic fauna of China